Joan Blaine (April 20, 1900 - April 18, 1949) was an American actress best known for her work in soap operas on old-time radio.

Early years
Blaine was born April 20, ca. 1900  in Fort Dodge, Iowa, and was a descendant of James G. Blaine, a 19th-century American politician who twice was the Republican candidate for president of the United States. Her father was a lawyer.

She graduated from Northwestern University and practiced law in Chicago for a year after receiving her degree. She also attended Columbia University Graduate School of Journalism.

Radio
A 1938 newspaper article described Blaine as "one of radio's leading actresses," and one in 1943 reported, "Joan was acclaimed the most popular daytime radio actress in the country." She was described in one old-time radio reference book as "one of the first real stars of the [soap opera] form, getting billing up front before the title."

One of Blaine's earliest roles on radio was playing the title character in The Story of Mary Marlin, beginning in 1934. She left the program March 26, 1937, "to fulfill a movie contract." She was featured in The House by the Side of the Road in 1934-1935 and had a role called "mysterious guest" in the Edgar Guest Welcome Valley program in 1936.

In 1937, she was featured in We Are Four, a "dramatic serial" on the Mutual Broadcasting System.

She starred in Valiant Lady, beginning March 7, 1938, on CBS, and continued in the lead role of Joan Barrett for most of the program's nine years on the air.

Blaine was also featured in A Tale of Today and Welcome Valley   and was the "narrator and reader of prose selections" on Music Magic.

Stage
Blaine had an apprenticeship with the Chicago Theater Guild. She had roles in two Broadway theatre productions -- Mystery Square and The Ghost Parade and appeared in the New York productions Spitfire, And So to Bed, and Winter's Tale. She also portrayed the lead character, Selena Peake, in summer stock theatre productions of So Big.

Film
Blaine appeared in a movie, The Knife.

Personal life
Blaine was married to William Pitts.

Death
Blaine died April 18, 1949, in New York Hospital.

Radio appearances

References 

1900 births
1949 deaths
American film actresses
American radio actresses
American stage actresses
20th-century American actresses